Catamayo is a city in the Loja Province, Ecuador.

It is served by Ciudad de Catamayo Airport.

References 
 www.inec.gov.ec
 www.ame.gov.ec

External links 
 Map of the Loja Province

Populated places in Loja Province

qu:Katamayu